Oliguria or hypouresis is the low output of urine specifically more than 80 ml/day but less than 400ml/day. The decreased output of urine may be a sign of dehydration, kidney failure, hypovolemic shock, hyperosmolar hyperglycemic nonketotic syndrome (HHNS), multiple organ dysfunction syndrome, urinary obstruction/urinary retention, diabetic ketoacidosis (DKA), pre-eclampsia, and urinary tract infections, among other conditions.

Beyond oliguria is anuria, which represents an absence of urine, clinically classified as below 80 or 100 ml/day.

The term oliguria is derived from oligo-meaning "small, little," + -uria, from the Greek word ouron, meaning "urine".

Definition
Oliguria is defined as a urine output that is less than 1 mL/kg/h in infants, less than 0.5 mL/kg/h in children, and less than 400 mL or 500 mL per 24h in adults - this equals 17 or 21 mL/hour. For example, in an adult weighing 70 kg it equals 0.24 or 0.3 mL/hour/kg. Alternatively, however, the value of 0.5 mL/kg/h is commonly used to define oliguria in adults as well.

Diagnostic approach
Perform ultrasound examination of the kidney to rule out obstructive processes.

The mechanisms causing oliguria can be categorized globally in three different categories:
 Prerenal: in response to hypoperfusion of the kidney (e.g. as a result of dehydration by poor oral intake, cardiogenic shock, diarrhea, G6PD deficiency, massive bleeding or sepsis)
 Renal: due to kidney damage (severe hypoperfusion, rhabdomyolysis, medication)
 Postrenal: as a consequence of obstruction of the urine flow (e.g. enlarged prostate, tumour compression urinary outflow, expanding hematoma or fluid collection)

Postoperative oliguria
Patients usually have a decrease in urine output after a major operation that may be a normal physiological response to:
 fluid/ blood loss – decreased glomerular filtration rate secondary to hypovolemia and/or hypotension
 response of adrenal cortex to stress -increase in aldosterone (Na and water retention) and antidiuretic hormone (ADH) release

Babies
Oliguria, when defined as less than 1 mL/kg/h, in infants is not attributed to kidney failure.

See also
 Polyuria (excessive urine production)
 Anuria  (absolute lack of urine output)
 Intraabdonmial hypertension (IAH) and Abdominal Compartment Syndrome (ACS)

References

External links 

Symptoms and signs: Urinary system